Tocci Glacier is a steep tributary glacier descending from Mount Lozen to enter the north side of Tucker Glacier, in the Admiralty Mountains. Mapped by United States Geological Survey (USGS) from surveys and U.S. Navy air photos, 1960–64. Named by Advisory Committee on Antarctic Names (US-ACAN) for Joseph J. Tocci II, U.S. Navy, aerographer's mate at McMurdo Station, 1967.

Glaciers of Victoria Land
Borchgrevink Coast